"Cuckoo" is a song performed by Israeli singer Netta. The song was released as a digital download on 16 May 2020 as the fifth and final single from her debut extended play Goody Bag. It was written by Bert Elliott, Krysta Marie Youngs and Netta Barzilai, and produced by J. R. Rotem and Elliott.

Background
In an interview, Netta explained the meaning behind the song, she said, "'Cuckoo' is personal because it also speaks about doubts in a romantic relationship." She also said that adding that for the last year and a half she's been in a relationship with Ilan Ben Or, a new immigrant from the US. "We've had some rough times because my life is not simple. I met Ilan after I became famous and wasn't sure whether he was sincere. Maybe because of my past, I always have doubts and this is echoed in 'Cuckoo' – do I really deserve to be loved?"

Live performances
On 16 May 2020, Netta performed the song during Eurovision: Europe Shine a Light. It replaced the Eurovision Song Contest 2020, which was planned to be held in Rotterdam, Netherlands, but was cancelled due to the COVID-19 pandemic.

Music video
A music video to accompany the release of "Cuckoo" was first released onto YouTube on 12 June 2020. The video was directed by Roy Raz.

Track listing

Personnel
Credits adapted from Tidal.
 Bert Elliott – producer, composer
 J. R. Rotem – producer
 Krysta Marie Youngs – composer
 Netta Barzilai – composer, vocals
 Chris Gehringer – engineer
 Matt Schaeffer – engineer

Charts

Release history

References

2020 singles
2020 songs
Netta Barzilai songs
English-language Israeli songs
BMG Rights Management singles
Song recordings produced by J. R. Rotem
Number-one singles in Israel